The Hofstetter Turbo is a Brazilian car created in the 1980s by Mario Richard Hofstetter. In 1980 Hofstetter pulled out his drawing paper and started to draw a prototype of the car. Mario Hofstetter made this car at this time because the Brazilian government was very strict and didn't allow many imports into Brazil. In 1982 he started to put the mid-engined car together with some other workers, and began the Hofstetter company in 1984. Mario Hofstetter only was able to sell 18 cars throughout (1986–1991).

Performance 
The Turbo featured a fiberglass body with gull-wing doors that was reportedly inspired by the Alfa Romeo Carabo concept car. The interior was upholstered in leather and featured an early digital dash. Early models of the Turbo were powered by a 1.8 L Inline-four engine from the Volkswagen Passat which was then equipped with a Garrett turbocharger and coupled to a 4-speed manual gearbox. Later models used a 2.0 L Inline-four engine out of a Volkswagen Santana that was also turbocharged with a Garrett turbo.

External links 
Hofstetter Turbo at QUATRO RODAS
Hofstetter Turbo at Best Cars Web Site

References 

Cars of Brazil
Automobiles with gull-wing doors
1980s cars
Rear mid-engine, rear-wheel-drive vehicles